Malthouse Broad is a broad (i.e., lake) at Ranworth in the Norfolk Broads.

The "Helen of Ranworth" is a traditional reedlighter, a boat that carried away the reed harvest. Now it ferries visitors from Malthouse Broad to Ranworth Broad.

Norfolk Broads